Krishna Kumar Menon (born 2 October 1965), better known by the stage name Kay Kay Menon, is an Indian actor who works predominantly in Hindi cinema, and also in Gujarati, Tamil, Marathi and Telugu cinema.

Early life
Menon was born in a Nair family in Thiruvananthapuram and raised in Ambarnath and Pune, Maharashtra.

He studied at the St. Joseph High School in Khadki, Pune. He passed his 10th grade in 1981. He did his Bachelors (Physics) from Mumbai University and his MBA from Department of Management Sciences (PUMBA) at the University of Pune, graduating in 1988 with a major in Marketing.

Menon's initial focus was working in the advertising industry including Kinetic Honda and Marlboro cigarette advertisements in India.

Career
He started his career in theatre productions where he met Nivedita Bhattacharya, whom he married. His first theatre break was opposite Naseeruddin Shah in Feroz Abbas Khan's Mahatma vs Gandhi.

In the early years of his career, Menon worked on television, with roles in the TV movies Zebra 2 and Last Train To Mahakali. He was praised for his role as a young Prime Minister in the Zee TV series Pradhan Mantri (2001), directed by Ketan Mehta. In The Hindu, Sevanti Ninan wrote, "an actor to watch: Kay Kay Menon ... this unusually tall actor who plays the pradhan mantri is a major saving grace" while in The Tribune, Amita Malik commented, "excellent acting by Menon, who skilfully conveys the physical as well as mental image of the honest politician".

Menon made his big screen debut with a small role in Naseem (1995), followed in 1999 by the lead role in Bhopal Express, a movie that went mostly unnoticed. This was the first in a series of initial setbacks in Menon's film career. In the early 2000s, he starred as a wicked rock musician in Anurag Kashyap's debut movie, Paanch, which struggled with censorship and has remained unreleased. Two other movies, Hazaaron Khwaishein Aisi and Black Friday, had to wait many years for a release date. Meanwhile, his commercial films Deewar (starring Amitabh Bachchan) and Silsiilay (with Shahrukh Khan) flopped at the box office. It was only in 2005, with the eventual release of the critically acclaimed Hazaaron Khwaishein Aisi, but with Ram Gopal Varma's Sarkar,  Menon had his break. Sarkar earned him a nomination for the Best Performance in a Negative Role at the Filmfare Awards. In The Tribune, Saibal Chatterjee called him "one of Bollywood's finest actors".

In 2007, he acted in Life in a... Metro, as an adulterous husband. In 2008, he appeared in Shaurya based on A Few Good Men . His portrayal of a ruthless army brigadier is still talked of among cinema lovers. In 2009, he starred in The Stoneman Murders where he played a police officer on the hunt for the Stoneman serial killer. He played the role of Dukki Bana in Gulaal.

His role as Khurram Mir in 2014's Haider bagged him a Filmfare and IIFA award for Best Supporting Actor.
He played a very crucial role in The Ghazi Attack as a Naval Captain based on an Indian Naval submarine, S21, intercepts a Pakistani submarine, PNS Ghazi, during routine surveillance and thwarts its mission of destroying  in 1971. He played a role as Vikram Singh in 2019's Penalty with co-actor Mohit Nain.

He impressed and gained more popularity with a role as Himmat Singh in 2020's Special Ops - a web series for Hotstar. In 2021, he again played the young version of Himmat Singh (R&AW leading officer) in Special Ops 1.5, the prequel part of Special Ops. OTT viewers admired his performance in this series. Following the resounding success of espionage thriller Special Ops, Hotstar Specials is set to ring in a new form of storytelling with the launch of ‘Special Ops Universe’, created and conceptualized by film-maker Neeraj Pandey and Friday Storytellers.

FilmographyAll films are in Hindi, unless otherwise stated.''

Films

Television

Web series

Short film(s)

References

External links

 
 
 

1966 births
Living people
Malayali people
Indian male film actors
20th-century Indian male actors
21st-century Indian male actors
Male actors from Mumbai
Male actors from Pune
Male actors in Gujarati-language films
Filmfare Awards winners
International Indian Film Academy Awards winners